The Valleys is a British reality television series based in Cardiff, Wales and broadcast on MTV. The show first aired on 25 September 2012. It follows youngsters from the South Wales Valleys as they move to Cardiff to live out their dreams with the help from their new bosses, AK and Jordan. On 1 June 2014 it had been announced that the show has been axed due to MTV venturing for new ideas and commissioning new shows such as Ex on the Beach.

History
Series 1 of The Valleys premiered on 25 September 2012.

It returned for series 2 on 30 April 2013. Before the series began, it was announced that twin brothers Anthony and Jason would be added to the cast. Cast member Aron also announced his departure from the show. The first promo for the second series premiered on 2 April 2013 during a new episode of Geordie Shore. On 23 April, a week before series 2 began, a special episode entitled "The Valleys: Filthy Bits" aired, which featured the best bits from series 1.

On 5 July 2013, cast member Leeroy confirmed there will be a Series 3 of The Valleys. On 14 January 2014, it was announced that a new cast member would join for the third series of the show. The cast member was revealed to be Jack Watkins, a 24-year-old stripper. The series premiered 25 February 2014 and was filmed in various locations around the UK and Ireland, as "Valleywood Nights" went on tour.

On 1 June 2014 it was announced that The Valleys had been axed by MTV due to the ratings drop, but there hasn't been an official comment from any MTV executives as of yet. "The Valleys has performed exceptionally well for MTV with three successful seasons behind it. However, with our audience always looking for new and engaging content, we're focused on developing new original programme ideas for the MTV schedule such as new smash hit Ex on the Beach to sit alongside returning favourites like Geordie Shore."

Series

Cast
The official cast members were revealed on 7 August 2012. They are Aron Williams, Carley Belmonte, Darren Chidgey, Jenna Jonathan, Lateysha Grace, Leeroy Reed, Liam Powell, Natalee Harris and Nicole Morris. The series also features two bosses that will mentor the cast as they try to make it in the city of Cardiff. The bosses being Jordan Reed and Anna 'AK' Kelle.

During episode 3 which aired on 9 October 2012 Lateysha Grace left the house after falling out with her fellow cast mates. She later returned in episode 4 when the female cast travelled to Port Talbot to bring her back to Cardiff.

In episode 4, which aired on 16 October 2012 Chidgey and Natalee were kicked out of the house by club "owner"(manager) Jordan Reed, after fighting with one another during a night out. Chidgey is later made a conditional offer (during episode 5) of being able to return to the house and series, as long as it's without Natalee. He chose to return to the house, however Natalee still featured in the series but only outside of the house. She remained a cast member for the second series and returned to the house during the second episode.

On 21 March 2013, it was announced that there'd be 2 new additions to the cast. Twins, Anthony and Jason Suminski. On the same day, Aron revealed that he would not be returning for the second series.

On 30 April 2013 during the first episode of series 2, Anthony and Jason made their first appearances. Leeroy and Natalee did not feature in this episode despite still being cast members. Natalee returned to the house during the second episode on 7 May after apologising to AK for her actions in the first series. During this episode, Carley decided to voluntarily leave the house after constant arguments with Natalee and Liam, but returned in the next episode. Leeroy returned to the series in Episode 4, and though he did not permanently move back into the house, he continued to make frequent visits and was also featured in scenes outside of the house until the end of the series. In the final episode of series 2, Carley voluntarily decided to return to The Valleys due to her continued issues with Chidgey and Natalee. Jordan and AK then revealed which cast members they would like to continue working with in the future, with everyone being asked to return for the next series apart from Liam and Nicole. In December 2013, Leeroy announced on Twitter that he would not be returning for the third series. On 27 January, Nicole announced she would be returning for the third series.

On 14 January 2014, it was confirmed that Jack Watkins had joined the cast. And on 27 January, despite originally being dropped from the show, it was announced that Nicole would be returning for the third series.

Duration of cast

Notes 
Key:  = "Cast member" is featured in this episode.
Key:  = "Cast member" arrives in the house.
Key:  = "Cast member" voluntarily leaves the house.
Key:  = "Cast member" is removed from the house.
Key:  = "Cast member" returns to the house.
Key:  = "Cast member" features in this episode, but outside of the house.
Key:  = "Cast member" does not feature in this episode.
Key:  = "Cast member" returns to the series.
Key:  = "Cast member" leaves the series.
Key:  = "Cast member" features in this episode despite not being an official cast member at the time.

Other appearances
As well as appearing in The Valleys, some of the cast members have competed in other reality TV shows including Big Brother.

Big Brother
Lateysha Grace – Series 17 (2016) – Eleventh

Reception

Critical reception
Upon its premiere, The Valleys was slated by viewers and Welsh politicians alike. Rhondda MP Chris Bryant called the premise "hideously patronising".

Welsh singer Charlotte Church was also highly critical of The Valleys. She tweeted that she felt it would be "exploitative" and "a horrific representation of the country that I love."

Kerry Taylor, MTV's director of television, said: "It's absolutely not about stereotyping...I feel whenever you make a successful reality show, there are always some accusations. But the show is absolutely celebrating these nine young people and their mentors. It's very much about their individual stories."

Controversy
Aside from the criticism over its portrayal of Wales, The Valleys has caused other controversies as well.

Cast member Lateysha Grace was arrested in September 2012 over accusations she assaulted another woman in a nightclub confrontation, but was later acquitted.

International broadcasts

References

2010s British reality television series
2012 British television series debuts
2014 British television series endings
English-language television shows
MTV original programming
Television shows set in Cardiff